The Fair is an epithet that may refer to:

People:
Charles IV of France (1294–1328), King of France and of Navarre, Count of Champagne
Demetrius the Fair (around 285 BC-249 BC or 250 BC), Hellenistic King of Cyrene
Eadwig (941?–959), King of England
Edith the Fair (c. 1025–c. 1086), first wife of King Harold II of England
Ewald the Fair, one of the Two Ewalds, saint and martyr in Old Saxony about 692
Frederick the Fair (c. 1289–1330), Duke of Austria and Styria as Frederick I, King of Germany (King of the Romans) from 1314 (anti-king until 1325) as Frederick III
Hasdrubal the Fair (c. 270–221 BC), Carthaginian military leader
Helena of Hungary, Queen of Croatia (died 1091)
Helga the Fair, 11th century woman said to have been the most beautiful in Iceland
Louis I of Brzeg (c. 1321–1398), Duke and regent of Legnica, Duke of Brzeg
Philip IV of France (1268–1314), King of France
Philip I of Castile, (1478–1503), King of Castile and Duke of Burgundy
Radu cel Frumos (1435–1475), Voivode (prince) of Wallachia, younger brother of Vlad the Impaler

In legend and fiction:
Elaine of Astolat, in Arthurian legend
Nimloth the Fair, a tree in J. R. R. Tolkien's fantasy universe

See also
List of people known as the Beautiful
List of people known as the Handsome

Lists of people by epithet